Thomas "Tucker" Croft was an Irish international footballer who played professionally in Ireland and the United States as an inside right.

Club
Born in Belfast, Croft played in his native Ireland for Dundela, Glentoran and Queen's Island. In 1924, he left Northern Ireland for the United States, joining the Fall River Marksmen of the American Soccer League. He was under contract to Queen's Island at the time and the move led to his suspension by the IFA. During his time with the Marksmen he was noted for his discipline problems and in 1925, he petitioned the Irish Football Association for re-admittance. When this was denied, he returned to Fall River. In 1926, Croft began the season with Fall River, but moved to J & P Coats after fourteen games. Croft was back with Fall River for the start of the 1927–1928 season, but quickly moved to the Newark Skeeters. In December 1927, the New York Nationals purchased Croft's contract. He played only eight games for the Nationals, and was back with the Skeeters for the 1928–1929 season, but played only one game before returning to Northern Ireland. The IFA re-admitted Croft on 7 December 1928 and he played with both Queen's Island and Glentoran, before retiring in 1930.

International
Croft also represented Ireland at international level between 1922 and 1924, scoring one goal in three appearances. The goal was the winning goal against England, and marked the first win for Ireland over England following the advent of the partition of Ireland in 1922.

External links
NIFG

References

Year of birth missing
1955 deaths
Association footballers from Belfast
American Soccer League (1921–1933) players
Association footballers from Northern Ireland
Pre-1950 IFA international footballers
Fall River Marksmen players
Glentoran F.C. players
J&P Coats players
New York Nationals (ASL) players
Newark Skeeters players
Association football inside forwards
Drumcondra F.C. players
Expatriate association footballers from Northern Ireland
Expatriate soccer players in the United States
Queen's Island F.C. players
Expatriate sportspeople from Northern Ireland in the United States